Time Is Money is the sixth solo studio album by American hip hop recording artist SPM. It was released on December 12, 2000 via Dope House Records and Universal Records. The album peaked at number 170 on the Billboard 200 and number 49 on the Top R&B/Hip-Hop Albums charts.

Track listing

Chart history

References

External links

2000 albums
South Park Mexican albums
Albums produced by Happy Perez